a&o Hotels and Hostels GmbH is a chain of hostels, headquartered in Berlin, that targets young travelers and backpackers, offering cheap group rooms and hotel rooms for two. The hostels are generally centrally located, mostly close to train stations. A&O has 40 subsidiaries in nine countries, making it the biggest privately owned hostel-chain in Europe. In 2019 it recorded about 5 million overnight stays and realised sales of €165 million.

History 
Founder Oliver Winter had the idea of opening a hostel after several trips through Europe in the late 1990s. There were few hostels in urban areas in Germany at that time; hostels in Germany were mostly situated in suburban or rural areas and were run by the German Youth Hostel Association; this was a problem for foreign travellers, because only members of the organisation could stay there.

In the year 2000 Winter and his landlord Michael Kluge opened the first a&o Hostel in Berlin Friedrichshain with 164 beds. After a year they doubled the number of beds, and in the years 2002 and 2004, they opened new hostels in Berlin. In 2005 the company opened its first houses outside Berlin, in Prague, Hamburg and Munich. From then on the company established various subsidiaries every year, mostly in Germany, but also in bordering countries.

In 2009 the company made headlines by winning a nearly 5-year-long Lawsuit against the DJH, the German Youth Hostel Association. In 2005 the DJH accused a&o of illegally using the word "Jugendherberge", the German term for youth hostel, which DJH had registered word as a brand in 1998. a&o objected and wanted the brand to be deleted, claiming that the word "Jugendherberge" is too common to be protected. Finally, in 2009 the Federal Patent Court of Germany decided that "Jugendherberge" should be deleted from the brand register.

In 2017 the Investment company TPG Capital purchased the majority of the company shares.

Expansion plans 
Since a&o has been acquired by TPG, they massively reinforced their expansion plans. The company published a list of 25 cities in Europe, where new hostels shall be opened in the near future. Besides nine locations in A&O's core markets Germany and Austria, the list also contains cities in Ireland, Scotland, England, the Netherlands, France, Spain, Portugal, Italy, Hungary, Poland, Sweden and Switzerland.

List of Locations 
List of a&o Hotels and Hostels by July 2019.

References 

Hotel chains in Germany
Hostels
Youth hostelling
Companies based in Berlin
Hotels established in 2000
German brands
2017 mergers and acquisitions
Hotel and leisure companies of Germany
2000 establishments in Germany